Randolph Hezekiah (born 18 January 1936) is a Trinidadian cricketer. He played in one first-class match for Trinidad and Tobago in 1955/56.

See also
 List of Trinidadian representative cricketers

References

External links
 

1936 births
Living people
Trinidad and Tobago cricketers